Jon Terje Øverland (born December 14, 1944) is a Norwegian alpine skier. He was born in Rjukan. He participated at the 1964 Winter Olympics in Innsbruck, where he competed in downhill, slalom and giant slalom. He also participated at the 1968 Winter Olympics in Grenoble.

He was Norwegian champion in downhill in 1968, 1969 and 1970.

References

1944 births
Living people
People from Rjukan
Norwegian male alpine skiers
Olympic alpine skiers of Norway
Alpine skiers at the 1964 Winter Olympics
Alpine skiers at the 1968 Winter Olympics
Sportspeople from Vestfold og Telemark